Kaabong is a town in the Northern Region of Uganda. It is the chief municipal, administrative and commercial center of Kaabong District, and the district headquarters are located there.

Location

The geographical coordinates of the town are 3°31'12.0"N, 34°07'12.0"E (Latitude:3.5200; Longitude:34.1200).

Population
The national census in 2002 estimated the population of Kaabong at 13,100. In 2010, the Uganda Bureau of Statistics (UBOS) estimated the population at 22,300. In 2011, UBOS estimated the mid-year population at 23,900.

In 2015, UBOS estimated the population of the town at 11,800. In 2020, the statistics agency estimates the mid-year population of Kaabong Town Council at 13,400 inhabitants. Of these, 6,900 (51.5 percent) were females and 6,500 (48.5 percent) were males. UBOS calculated that the population of Kaabong Town expanded at an average rate of 2.6 percent every year between 2015 and 2020.

Points of interest
The following points of interest lie within the town limits or close to the edges of town:  (a) the offices of Kaabong Town Council (b) Kaabong Central Market (c) the headquarters of Kaabong District Administration.

Also located here is Kaabong Parish Catholic Church, a place of worship affiliated with the Roman Catholic Diocese of Kotido. Simon Lokodo was the parish priest here before he was elected to parliament to represent Dodoth County in this district, in 2006.

Kaabong General Hospital, a 100-bed hospital under the supervision of the Uganda Ministry of Health, is also located here, off the Kotido-Kaabong Road. Adjacent to the public hospital, is a branch of Stanbic Bank Uganda.

See also
Karamoja sub-region
Karimojong
List of cities and towns in Uganda

References

External links
 Kaabong, So Little Done, A Lot More To Work On

Populated places in Northern Region, Uganda
Kaabong District
Karamoja